Blood Money is a British television serial written by Arden Winch and produced by the BBC in 1981.

The series starred Michael Denison as Captain Percival, an operative of British Special Intelligence, who works with Scotland Yard to solve the kidnapping of the young son of the Administrator General of the United Nations by a terrorist cell. As originally written (under the title "Blood Royal"), the kidnapped child was a member of the Royal Family called Prince Rupert, but after objections by the real Royals, the character was changed.

The six-part serial was produced by Gerard Glaister, previously responsible for the Second World War drama series Secret Army. Blood Money also reunited a number of former Secret Army cast members – Bernard Hepton played the Chief Superintendent of the anti terrorist squad with Daniel Hill as Insp. Danny Clark, a brilliant linguist. Daniel Hill had also appeared in 2 episodes of Secret Army as two different characters, the last one directed by Michael E Briant. Juliet Hammond-Hill and Stephen Yardley also appeared as two of the terrorists.

The character of Captain Percival later appeared in two more BBC thriller serials – Skorpion in 1983, involving the pursuit of an assassin in Scotland, and Cold Warrior in 1984, an eight-part collection of individual stories which also starred Daniel Hill and Jack McKenzie.

Cast
 Michael Denison – Captain Aubrey Percival
 Bernard Hepton – Det. Chief Supt. Meadows
 Juliet Hammond-Hill – Irene Kohl
 Gary Whelan – Danny Connors
 Stephen Yardley – James Drew
 Cavan Kendall – Charles Vivian
 Daniel Hill – Insp. Clark
 Anna Mottram – WPC Barratt
 Reg Woods – Det. Sgt. Summers
 Jack McKenzie – Det. Insp. Perry
 Dean Harris – Sgt. Danny Quirk
 Grant Warnock – Viscount Rupert Fitzcharles

References

External links
 

Blood Money
Blood Money
Blood Money
BBC television dramas
Blood Money